The Commonwealth Parliamentary Association (CPA), previously known as the Empire Parliamentary Association,  is an organisation which works to support good governance, democracy and human rights. 

In 1989 the  patron of the CPA was the Head of the Commonwealth, Queen Elizabeth II. The vice-patronship rotates amongst Heads of State and of Government of the Commonwealth nations who host its forthcoming annual Commonwealth Parliamentary Conference. The Association's supreme authority is the General Assembly, constituted by delegates to the annual Commonwealth Parliamentary Conference. The business and activities of the CPA are managed by an Executive Committee, which reports to the General Assembly. The CPA's funds are derived from membership fees paid by its branches, as well as from two trust funds and benefactors.

The official publication of the Commonwealth Parliamentary Association is The Parliamentarian, the Journal of Commonwealth Parliaments which was first published in January 1920. The organisation administers the Commonwealth Women Parliamentarians (CWP), a network across the Commonwealth which promotes greater representation for women in Parliament; the CPA Small Branches network, representing parliaments and legislatures with populations below 500,000 people; the Commonwealth Parliamentarians with Disabilities (CPwD) network; and the Commonwealth Youth Parliament, an annual gathering of young people hosted by a Commonwealth Parliament.

The Commonwealth Parliamentary Association (CPA) currently has approximately 180 branches and is divided into nine regions: Africa, Asia, Australia, British Islands and Mediterranean, Canada, Caribbean, Americas and Atlantic, India, Pacific, and South-East Asia. The CPA Headquarters Secretariat is based in London.

History 

The CPA was founded as the Empire Parliamentary Association in 1911, with its first branches being Australia, Canada, Newfoundland, New Zealand, South Africa and the United Kingdom, the latter branch administering the Association as a whole. In 1948 the Association changed its name to the current Commonwealth Parliamentary Association, and invited all branches to participate in the organisation's administration.

Officers 
The office of Chairperson of the CPA Executive Committee is held by Ian Liddell-Grainger MP of the Parliament of the United Kingdom since August 2022. He was previously Acting Chairperson from April 2021.

Previous CPA Chairpersons have included: Emilia Monjowa Lifaka MP, Deputy Speaker of the National Assembly of Cameroon (2017-2021); Shirin Sharmin Chaudhury, Speaker of Jatiyo Sangsad Bhaban of Bangladesh (2014–2017), who succeeded Sir Alan Haselhurst MP (2011–2014), formerly Chairman of Ways and Means of the UK Parliament.

The position of CPA Vice-Chairperson is currently held by Hon. Osei Kyei Mensah Bonsu, MP, Majority Leader and Member of the Parliament of Ghana.

Since August 2022, the CPA Treasurer is Anurag Sharma (politician), MP of the Parliament of India.

Since August 2022, the Chairperson of the Commonwealth Women Parliamentarians is Hon. Dr Zainab Gimba, MP from the House of Representatives (Nigeria). Previous CWP Chairpersons include: Shandana Gulzar Khan, MNA from the National Assembly of Pakistan; Hon. Noraini Ahmad MP, Parliament of Malaysia; Rt Hon. Rebecca Kadaga MP, Parliament of Uganda; Hon. Alix Boyd Knights, House of Assembly of Dominica; Ms Kashmala Tariq, National Assembly of Pakistan; Hon. Lindiwe Maseko, Parliament of South Africa and Gauteng Provincial Legislature.

Since August 2022, the Chairperson for the CPA Small Branches is Joy Burch, MLA, Speaker of the Australian Capital Territory Legislative Assembly. Previous CPA Small Branches Chairpersons include Niki Rattle, Speaker of the Parliament of the Cook Islands and Hon. Angelo Farrugia, Speaker of the Parliament of Malta.

Since August 2022, the Chairperson of the Commonwealth Parliamentarians with Disabilities (CPwD) is Hon. Laura Kanushu MP from the Parliament of Uganda. Previous CPwD Chairpersons include Hon. Dennitah Ghati HSC from the National Assembly (Kenya) and Hon. Kevin Murphy (Canadian politician), former Speaker of the House of Assembly of Nova Scotia.

Secretaries-General 

The CPA's 8th Secretary-General is Stephen Twigg. He was appointed in August 2020 for a four-year term. Twigg was elected to the Parliament of the United Kingdom as a Member of Parliament from 1997 to 2005 (Enfield Southgate) and from 2010 to 2019 (Liverpool West Derby). During his parliamentary career, he held several senior positions including chairing the International Development Select Committee, Minister for Schools and a range of Shadow Front Bench roles. 

Previous Secretaries-General have been:
Karimulla Akbar Khan, UK/Guyanese Lawyer (2016-2019); William F. Shija, former Minister Tanzania Parliament (2007–2014); Denis Marshall, former Minister New Zealand Parliament (2002–2006); Arthur Donahoe, former Speaker Nova Scotia House of Assembly (1993–2001); David Tonkin, former Premier South Australia (1986–1992); Sir Robin Vandervelt from South Africa (1961–1985); Sir Howard d’Egville (1949–1960).

Members
Members of the CPA are listed below. Both national and subnational parliaments are included.

Additional links 

 The CPA Secretariat Headquarters CPA HQ – you will also find links to The Parliamentarian, the Journal of Commonwealth Parliaments, published by the CPA. Link to The Parliamentarian
 The Africa Region of the CPA CPA Africa
 The British Islands and Mediterranean Region and UK Branch of the CPA is based in Westminster CPA UK
 The Canadian Region of the CPA CPA Canada
 The Australia Region of the CPA CPA Australia
 The Caribbean, Americas and Atlantic Region of the CPA CPA CAA
 American Institute of Parliamentarians – similar association for United States.

References

Notes
 www.oxfordjournals.org
 Commonwealth Round Table, International Forum and Journal of the Commonwealth

Official Gazettes / Hansards 
List of British colonial gazettes

External links

 
 UK Parliamentary Archives, Records of the Commonwealth Parliamentary Association

Commonwealth Family
1911 establishments in the United Kingdom
International organisations based in London
Organizations established in 1911
Politics of Africa
Politics of Asia